Chad Arrington, known professionally as Chad Focus, is an American musician and convicted felon.

Career
Arrington took up classical piano lessons at a young age. After graduating from college, he started the record label Focus Music Entertainment.

In August 2017, BET released music video "Get to the Money". He released the single "Dance with Me", which was produced by J. Oliver, featuring Raeliss.

Legal issues 

In June 2019, federal prosecutors announced Arrington had been indicted on charges of conspiracy, wire fraud and aggravated identity theft. They alleged he used his employer-issued credit card to make $4.1 million in unauthorized purchases. Much of that money, prosecutors say, was spent promoting his music venture, including buying likes and shares on social media, inflating his play counts on streaming platforms and paying for billboard space.

In February 2020, Arrington pleaded guilty to conspiracy to commit wire fraud. In May 2021, a federal judge sentenced him to two years and six months in prison. At his sentencing hearing, Arrington claimed amphetamine use and an undiagnosed mental illness helped lead to his offenses.

He was held in the low-security wing of Federal Correctional Complex, Petersburg in Petersburg, Virginia and later transferred to a reentry program. He is scheduled to be released March 21, 2023.

Discography

Charted singles

Note: As of the week of April 14, 2018, moved up from the debut at number 47 the week of April 7, 2018.

References

External links 

Date of birth missing (living people)
Living people
21st-century American singers
Musicians from Baltimore
Year of birth missing (living people)
21st-century African-American male singers
21st-century American male singers
Singers from Maryland
American people convicted of mail and wire fraud